Vaughnictis is an extinct genus of synapsid from the Early Permian of Colorado in the family Eothyrididae. It was originally assigned to the genus Mycterosaurus before it was assigned to the new genus Vaughnictis. It is known from a partial skull, hindlimb, and a few ribs. It is closely related to Eothyris.

References 

Permian synapsids of North America
Prehistoric synapsid genera
Caseasaurs